Godi, GODI, Goði or Gothi may refer to:

 Gothi or goði, the Old Norse term for a priest and chieftain
 Gothi, Nepal, a village and municipality
 Pont-ar-Gothi, a village in Wales 
 Villa Godi, in northern Italy
 Godi-media, a pejorative term used to describe the parts of Indian corporate media that are defined by their subservience to government authorities

People
 Franco Godi (born 1940), Italian composer, conductor, arranger and record producer
 Themba Godi (born 1966), South African politician 
 Snorri Goði (963–1031), chieftain in Western Iceland
 Godi Daniel Melanchthon (1934–1994), an Indian Pastor